Katun is a rural locality (a selo) in Barguzinsky District, Republic of Buryatia, Russia. The population was 185 as of 2010.

Geography 
Katun is located 91 km west of Barguzin (the district's administrative centre) by road. Monakhovo is the nearest rural locality.

References 

Rural localities in Barguzinsky District
Populated places on Lake Baikal